was a political party in Japan.

History
The party was established as the Dōmei Club (同盟倶楽部) in November 1892 by a group of 24 mostly independent MPs. It gradually became closer to the Rikken Kaishintō, and in January 1894 was renamed the Dōmei Seisha after becoming a political association.

The party won 24 seats in the March 1894 elections, and in May that year it merged with Dōshi Seisha to form Rikken Kakushintō.

Election results

References

Defunct political parties in Japan
Political parties established in 1892
1892 establishments in Japan
Political parties disestablished in 1894
1894 disestablishments in Japan